Dillalah Station is a pastoral lease that operates as a cattle station in Queensland.

The property is situated on the western side of the Warrego River and is intersected by the Nimminmulla Creek with several permanent waterholes. The country comprises open plains covered in Mulga, Saltbush, bluebush, cottonbush, Mitchell grass and yarron.

The name is Aboriginal in origin, Dillilah means Galah in the local dialect. The name is taken from a waterhole along the Warrego River.

The area was initially established prior to 1864 by Mr. W. G. Conn who still owned it in 1864 when it was stocked with 500 head of cattle. In 1869 the property was owned by Messrs Russell and Company, who put it up for sale stocked with 2,100 head of cattle. In 1873 the property was on the market again along with Yarronvale Station. Stocked with 2,500 head of cattle improvements at the time included a house, kitchen, store and stockyards.

The property sold at auction in 1877 for £32,000 including stock, but the buyers name was not declared. The Morgan brothers owned the property in 1883 and soon introduced sheep to the run.

The state government purchased the homestead area of the run in 1916. The total area acquired was  stocked with 3,100 head of cattle. A total of £13,000 was paid with an extra £10,000 expected to be spent on improvements in the future.

In 2010 the property received  of rain over a period of two days. The owner, Brock Hindmarsh, was looking forward to a good season with the Balonne, Warrego and Paroo Rivers all in full flood.

See also
List of ranches and stations

References

Stations (Australian agriculture)
Pastoral leases in Queensland
South West Queensland